Eupogonius griseus is a species of beetle in the family Cerambycidae. It was described by Fisher in 1926. It is known from Cuba.

References

Eupogonius
Beetles described in 1926
Endemic fauna of Cuba